Rodney Michael (born 10 August 1999) is a Sierra Leonean footballer who plays as a forward for FK Mornar of the Montenegrin First League.

Career

Youth
Michael played three seasons of high school soccer at Dunn School, been named  2016-17 California Gatorade Soccer Player of the Year and lead the Earwigs to the CIF Southern Section Championship in 2015 and 2017. Michael earned All-CIF honors all three seasons after scoring 74 goals and tallying 43 assists in his career. Michael also played club soccer for USSDA side Santa Barbara Soccer Club from 2014 to 2017, helping the club to the 2016 U18 National Championship and earned Best-XI honors.

College
Michael attended the University of California, Santa Barbara in 2017 to play college soccer. Over four seasons with the Gauchos, Michael made 59 appearances, scoring 23 goals and tallying 15 assists. During his time at college, Michael earned accolades including  Big West All-Freshman Team, All-Big West First Team and Big West Freshman of the Year in 2017, All-Big West First Team and All-Far West Region First Team in 2018, Top Drawer Soccer All-America Second Team and United Soccer Coaches All-Far West Region First Team in 2019. He didn't play a senior season due to the COVID-19 pandemic.

Professional
Michael was tipped to be drafted in the 2021 MLS SuperDraft, but wasn't one of the 86 picks. He spent time on trial with USL Championship side Pittsburgh Riverhounds in April 2021, but wasn't signed by the team.

Michael spent time with amateur USL League Two side South Georgia Tormenta 2 before planning to play his senior college season later in 2021. However, South Georgia Tormenta's professional USL League One side opted to offer him a professional contract, and he signed with the club on June 7, 2021. He made his professional debut on June 19, 2021, appearing as a 56th-minute substitute during a 3–1 win over Greenville Triumph. He netted his first professional goal on 30 June 2021, scoring Tormenta's lone goal in a 2–1 loss to Toronto FC II.

On March 22, 2022, Michael was transferred from Tormenta to USL Championship side Indy Eleven. He left Indy Eleven following their 2022 season.

Michael signed with FK Mornar of the Montenegrin First League in February 2023.

References

External links
Rodney Michael at UCSB Athletics

1999 births
Association football forwards
Expatriate soccer players in the United States
Indy Eleven players
Living people
Sierra Leonean emigrants to the United States
Sierra Leonean expatriate footballers
Sierra Leonean expatriate sportspeople in the United States
Sierra Leonean footballers
Soccer players from California
Tormenta FC players
UC Santa Barbara Gauchos men's soccer players
USL League One players